Pseudodibolia is a genus of flea beetles in the family Chrysomelidae. There are 4 described species in North America and the Neotropics.

Selected species
 Pseudodibolia opima (LeConte, 1878)
 Pseudodibolia picea Jacoby, 1891

References

Alticini
Chrysomelidae genera
Articles created by Qbugbot
Taxa named by Martin Jacoby